The 1974 Mississippi State Bulldogs football team represented Mississippi State University during the 1974 NCAA Division I football season. Led by second-year coach Bob Tyler, the Bulldogs finished 9–3 and qualified for their first bowl game in 11 years. In addition, the Bulldogs finished ranked No. 17 in the final AP Poll, their first ranked finish in 17 seasons. Quarterback Rockey Felker was awarded SEC "Player of the Year" by the Nashville Banner. Defensive tackle Jimmy Webb was voted to multiple All-American teams.

Schedule

References

Mississippi State
Mississippi State Bulldogs football seasons
Sun Bowl champion seasons
Mississippi State Bulldogs football